Does the Bible Belt is the third album and ninth Bravo stand-up comedy special by stand-up comedian Kathy Griffin, and eleventh special overall.

Track listing

Personnel

Technical and production
Cori Abraham - executive producer
Andy Cohen - executive producer
Kathy Griffin - executive producer
Jenn Levy - executive producer
Paul Miller - executive producer
Kimber Rickabaugh - executive producer
David W. Foster - film editor
Cisco Henson - executive in charge of production
Josh Jackson - production supervisor, script supervisor
Lesley Maynard - production supervisor
Gene Crowe - associate director, stage manager
Dave Bell - production assistant
Chris Keyes - production assistant
David Layne - production assistant
Niles Maddox - production assistant
Jordan Nefouse - assistant production coordinator

Visuals and imagery
Jennifer Montoya - hair stylist, make-up artist
Ashlee Mullen - make-up artist
Paul Lennon - lighting director
Simon Miles - lighting designer

Award and nominations
The live Bravo performance special was nominated for the Grammy for Best Comedy Album in the 53rd Grammy Awards.

References

External links
Kathy Griffin's Official Website

Kathy Griffin albums
Stand-up comedy albums
2010 live albums